The WWA World Heavyweight Championship was a professional wrestling world heavyweight championship in the Indianapolis-based World Wrestling Association from the promotion's formation in 1964 until the late 1980s.

Title history

References

External links
WWA World Heavyweight title history (Indianapolis)

World heavyweight wrestling championships
Professional wrestling in Indianapolis